Children of the Night may refer to:

Film and television 
 Children of the Night (1921 film), a Fox Film release
 Children of the Night (1985 film), an American television film directed by Robert Markowitz
 Children of the Night (1991 film), an American horror film directed by Tony Randel
 Children of the Night, a 1999 documentary short produced by Arthur Cohn
 "Children of the Night" (Hemlock Grove), a television episode
 "Children of the Night", an episode of The Heights

Literature 
 Children of the Night (poetry collection), by Edwin Arlington Robinson, 1897
 "The Children of the Night", a 1931 short story by Robert E. Howard
 Children of the Night (Lackey novel), by Mercedes Lackey, 1990
 Children of the Night (Simmons novel), by Dan Simmons, 1992
 Children of the Night Award, given by the Dracula Society

Music 
 Children of the Night, a group that appeared on the British television programme Juke Box Jury in 1967

Albums 
 Children of the Night (album) or the title track, by Nash the Slash, 1981
 The Children of the Night (album), by Tribulation, 2015
 Children of the Night, by 52nd Street, 1985
 Children of the Night, an EP by Dream Evil, 2003
 13 Stairway - The Children of the Night, by Balzac, 1998

Songs 
 "Children of the Night" (Richard Marx song), 1990
 "Children of the Night" (Wayne Shorter song), composed by Shorter and recorded by Art Blakey & the Jazz Messengers, 1961
 "Children of the Night", by The Blackout from The Best in Town, 2009
 "Children of the Night", by Blutengel from Seelenschmerz, 2001
 "Children of the Night", by Doro Pesch from The Ballads, 1998
 "Children of the Night", by Juno Reactor from Bible of Dreams, 1997
 "Children of the Night", by Manilla Road from Mystification, 1987
 "Children of the Night", by Nakatomi, 1996
 "Children of the Night", by The Stylistics from Round 2, 1973
 "Children of the Night", by Survivor from Eye of the Tiger, 1982
 "Children of the Night", by Whitesnake from Whitesnake, 1987
 "The Children of the Night", by Bliss n Eso from Running on Air, 2010
 "The Children of the Night", by Lordi from The Monsterican Dream, 2004

Other uses
 Children of the Night: Vampires, a 1996 accessory for the role-playing game Advanced Dungeons & Dragons
 Individuals with Xeroderma pigmentosum

See also 
 Children of Nyx, the Goddess of Night in Greek mythology
 Child of the Night (disambiguation)
 Children of the Light (disambiguation)